Monstera gracilis is a flowering plant plant in family Araceae.

Distribution 
It is native to southern Venezuela and Northern Peru.

References 

gracilis